Hsp70-binding protein 1 is a protein that in humans is encoded by the HSPBP1 gene.

Interactions 

HSPBP1 has been shown to interact with HSPA8 and HSPA4.

References

Further reading 

 
 
 
 
 
 
 
 
 
 
 
 
 
 

Armadillo-repeat-containing proteins